The 1912–13 season was the 40th season of competitive football in Scotland and the 23rd season of the Scottish Football League.

Scottish League Division One

Champions: Rangers

Scottish League Division Two

Scottish Cup

Falkirk were winners of the Scottish Cup after a 2–0 final win over Raith Rovers.

Other honours

National

County

. *replay

Highland League

Junior Cup
Inverkeithing United FC were winners of the Junior Cup after a 1–0 win over Dunipace in the final.

Scotland national team

Key:
 (H) = Home match
 (A) = Away match
 BHC = British Home Championship

See also
1912–13 Aberdeen F.C. season

Notes and references

External links
Scottish Football Historical Archive

 
Seasons in Scottish football